Fritz Geißler 
(or Geissler) (16 September 1921 in Wurzen, Saxony – 11 January 1984 in Bad Saarow, Brandenburg) was one of the most important composers of the German Democratic Republic.

The son of Elsa and Walther Geißler, he was raised in modest circumstances. His first violin lessons came from the leader of a local tenants' association's mandolin-band, himself a pipe-fitter. Following graduation from public school, Geissler went into training with the town-pipers band of Naunhof. After the conclusion of this most inauspicious education he earned the means to continue private lessons in violin, piano, and music theory as a bar and coffee house fiddler in Leipzig. Later, in 1979, he used his experiences from this time in his opera Die Stadtpfeifer ("The Town Pipers").

In 1940 he was conscripted into the Wehrmacht as a musician, and ordered to Guernsey in 1942, where he served in the Luftwaffe's musical corps.  In 1945 he became a prisoner of war of the English, where he was offered the opportunity to play second violin in a string quartet, and to compose or arrange choral settings for the prison choir. After his release in 1948 he studied composition and viola at the music college in Leipzig under Max Dehnert, Arnold Matz and Wilhelm Weismann.

Subsequently, due to a hand injury he had to give up his job as violist with the State Symphony Orchestra of Gotha. From 1953 to 1954 he studied composition again, at the College of Music at Berlin-Charlottenburg under Hermann Wunsch and Boris Blacher. Beginning in 1954, Geissler taught theory of music and composition at the Institute for Musical Education, at the University of Leipzig; later he became docent and professor of composition at the musical colleges in Leipzig and Dresden. His pupils included Wilfried Krätzschmar, Peter Hermann, Reinhard Pfundt, Karl Ottomar Treibmann, Friedrich Schenker and Lothar Voigtländer. From 1956 to 1968 he was president of the Leipzig Composers Society; from 1971 he was a member of the East German Arts Academy, the same year that he received a national award; and from 1972 he was vice-president of the East German Composers Society.

He died on 11 January 1984 at the age of 62.

Works
The compositional legacy of Fritz Geißler involves about 140 pieces, including eleven symphonies, concertos for violin, flute, cello, piano, and organ, four operas -- "Der Zerbrochene Krug" ("The Smashed Jug"), "Der Schatten" ("The Shadow"), "Der Verrueckte Jourdain" ("The Crazy Jourdain"), and "Das Chagrinleder" ("Shagreen"), ballets, cantatas, oratorios, and chamber music of widely varying types and settings.  His works were performed by noted artists, and by important orchestras and opera houses of both East and West Germany and elsewhere.

His most important works are arguably the operas, including an adaptation (from 1968 to 1969) of Heinrich von Kleist's comedy Der zerbrochne Krug. However, his eleven symphonies were also well received, and have been performed by outstanding groups like the Gewandhausorchester Leipzig and the Staatskapelle Dresden. His Second Symphony (1962-1964) was the first East German symphony to employ serialism.

External links
Official web site, featuring a full works-list and discography
Interview with Arila Siegert about the chamber-opera "Der Zerbrochene Krug"

1921 births
1984 deaths
20th-century classical composers
Academic staff of the Hochschule für Musik Carl Maria von Weber
German opera composers
Male opera composers
People from Wurzen
German male classical composers
20th-century German composers
20th-century German male musicians